Chanchamayo District is one of six districts of the province Chanchamayo in Peru. Its capital city is La Merced.

See also
 Kuntur Muyunan
 Pampa Hermosa Reserved Zone

References

States and territories established in 1855
1855 establishments in Peru